The area of today's Visoko is considered to be a nucleus from where Bosnian statehood was developed in 10th century. The expanded valley of the river Bosna around today's Visoko was the biggest agriculture area in central Bosnia, so fertile ground around Visoko was ideal for development of early political center of Bosnian nobility.

The settlement that was in Visoko field has been associated with name Bosnia for a long time, only since the 1350s has the name Visoki became widely used. Visoko and its valley with Mile, Moštre, Podvisoki was an early center of the Bosnian medieval state, and the site where the first Bosnian King Tvrtko I was crowned. The old town of Visoki, located on Visočica hill, was a politically important fortress, and its inner bailey, Podvisoki, was an early example of a Bosnian medieval urban area.

History

Medieval settlement Bosnia 
In this early period, we know that first known ruler of Bosnia was Knyaz Stephen of Bosnia, who ruled roughly the area of today's Sarajevo and Visoko fields. Pavao Anđelić considers Visoko field to be the core from where early Slavs in the 7th and 8th century expanded the term Bosnia as a territorial unit.

The place known as Bosnia is mentioned in 17 medieval sources. A number of documents in Latin mention Bosnia in the context of a settlement. Stephen II, Ban of Bosnia, writes charter in 1334 in Bossina in curia nostra. Ragusans wrote in 1367 about the location of St. Nikola church as conventus sancti Nicolae de Bosna.

With times Visoki has become a prevalent name for the medieval area that was known simply as Bosna (Bosnia) Names for Visoko varied in literature: Vizoka, Uisochi, Vissokium, Vissochi, Visuki, Visochium.

Bosnian banate 

Bosnia was a banate by 1154. The first domestic ruler was Bosnian ban, Kulin. His plate was found in Biskupići, a small place just outside of Visoko. The plate was once part of a church built by Kulin. According to Pavao Anđelić and others Bilino Polje abjuration happened in Visoko valley, as Latin sources do not indicate where exactly this meeting took place, other than: by river, and that monastery is located beside town Bosna. His plate one part of Kulin church, and that's the reason some authors believe that meeting took place in Biskupići (which is derived from biskup, meaning bishop) and not in today field of Bilino, near Zenica, as there are no records of significant settlement there.

Medieval settlement Bosna (civitas Bosna) is mentioned in documents in 12th century. Mile is mentioned in 1244 as a place where Stephen II Kotromanić built Franciscan monastery of st. Nicholas. After the death of Stephen II, he is succeeded by young ban Tvrtko, who would become the first king of Bosnia. His mother Jelena Šubić played an important role during his early reign. She went to the Kingdom of Hungary in 1354 and asked king Louis I of Hungary for confirmation of Tvrtko's rule in Bosnia. She held a stanak (assembly of nobility) in Mile, Visoko, asking noblemen to confirm all rights of Tvrtko, who was 15 years old by that time. Old town of Visoki on Visočica hill is first mentioned in charted that was issued on 1 September 1355, where Tvrtko I granted Ragusians all benefits and freedom in trade, which has been customary since the time of Kulin (see Charter of Ban Kulin). Podvisoki is mentioned in 1363, but its glory days happened during the Kingdom of Bosnia.

Bosnian kingdom 
The coronation of Tvrtko I Kotromanić was held on 26 October 1377 in the Church of St. Nicholaus, Mile. The Bosnian banate transformed into a kingdom. The fact this coronoation took place around Visoko has been proven archaeologically. Tvrtko Kotromanić wrote to Hrvoje Vukčić Hrvatinić on 12 March 1380 out from the royal court in Moštre (Moištri in medieval sources), which was also located in the Visoko basin.

Political and trading center of Bosnia 
The trading center of the Bosnian kingdom was Podvisoki, which had a considerable colony of Ragusian merchants. From 1404 to 1428, Podvisoki was a frequent caravan destination. Milaš Radomirić was a prominent merchant from Visoko, later accepted as a Republic of Ragusa citizen. On April 9 1428 a wedding engagement between Tvrtko II and Dorothy Garai was made and by July 31 Ragusan merchants asked the queen to stop by Podvisoki so she could receive gifts. The biggest caravan shipment was recorded in 1428. On August 9 Vlachs committed to Ragusan lord Tomo Bunić, that they will with 600 horses deliver 1500 modius of salt. Mile was one of the places where Bosnian nobility and kings held stanak.

Struggle for power 
Ostoja of Bosnia was one of the most active kings to leave traces in Visoko. He assumed his role as a king in 1398, but after 4 years he was forced to flee Bosnia. The nobility on the side of Tvrtko II held a meeting in Mile and decided to overthrow Ostoja because of his pro-Hungarian stance. Ostoja had lost the support of almost the whole nobility at the time. A difficult and very long stanak was held on June 5 1404. Hungarians decided to send an army into Bosnia, and Podvisoki was looted on March 4 1410. They even captured some Ragusan merchants stationed in Podvisoki, for which the Republic of Ragusa protested Sigismund, King of Hungary  In 1412 Vuk Kotromanić, nephew of king Ostoja, killed and stole silver from one Ragusan merchant called Jakša Bunić. Ragusans demanded that Vuk be punished for his crime, but there is no evidence that he was ever prosecuted. However, king Ostoja remained in power and Tvrtko II went into hiding.
King Ostoja died in 1418, which reignited unrest in the kingdom and eventually escalated into a civil war. Nobility once again didn't approve of the king, this time the son of Ostoja, Stjepan Ostojić. He only had a handful of nobelmen behind him, namely Petar Pavlović and Radosav Vladimirić. Stjepan Ostojić ruled until June 5, 1420, when a meeting of the nobility in Visoko sealed his fate. Crucial event for Ostojić's demise would be conciliation between Radosav Pavlović and Duke Sandalj Hranić.

Tvrtko II appeared around this time, and he will have the support of Bosnian nobility in Visoko, that included voivod Vukmir, mayor Dragiša, knez Juraj Vojsalić, knez Pribić, knez Radič Radojević of Pribinić-Radojević noble family, knez Batić Mirković, knez Juraj Dragičević, knez Petar Klešić, voivod Ivko, and voivod Pavao Jurjević. Earlier that year that same nobility had supported Ostojić in one meeting that was held at the start of 1420, but Tvrtko II this time was assisted by Ottoman Empire in reclaiming his throne and made Visoko his royal court in 1421.

Visoko held a meeting with Republic of Venice representatives, as they were granted the freedoms in trade in a charter issued on December 21, 1422 in Visoko. Ishak Bey retreated with his forces and Tvrtko would become undisputed king. By 1432 a new pretender to the throne emerged, namely Radivoj Ostojić, illegitimate son of king Ostoja. Tvrtko II by this time had lost the support of the Bosnian nobility, and once again Hungarians entered the scene, but this time they supported Tvrtko II and reestablished him as king. Visoko from this time stagnated and began to lose its importance. Ottoman Empire was becoming a real threat to Bosnian Kingdom, and Visoko valley soon became part of the Ottoman frontier.

Fall of the Kingdom 
Ottoman Empire by 1451 had a stronghold in Vrhbosna (today's Sarajevo) and Visoko was not safe anymore. Economic activity in Podvisoki faded and the king together with the nobility went into the north-east, where they retreated into better fortified positions like Bobovac and Ključ.

In this twilight years of the kingdom of Bosnia, Thomas of Bosnia began persecuting members of the Bosnian Church, that was considered heretic by the Catholic Church, as a means to ensure help from the west against the ever growing threat of theOttoman Empire. It seemed to work, as for the first time crown for a king in Bosnia would come from Rome itself and crowning was scheduled to take place in Visoko. Banishment of Bosnian Church followers who always had a stronghold in Visoko area was the reason why in 1450, followers of Bosnian Church demolished Franciscan monastery in Visoko. It was rebuilt shortly after by Mihovil Ostojić (Ostoides). By 1462 Visoko was the center of Ottoman territorial area, known as the Visoko nahiye. There are no records that Ottomans besieged town of Visoki, before or after 1463. The town was abandoned before 1503, because it is not mentioned in the Turkish-Hungarian treaty from of that year. In 1626 Đorđić mentioned Visoki among abandoned towns.

Visoko valley and notable centers

Visoki 

The royal town of Visoki was a fortress which existed during the time of the medieval Bosnian state. The first mention of the town happened on 1 September 1355, but it is believed to have been built even earlier. It was used by Bosnian bans and kings as a ruler's residence from which several official charters were written to other states. It was also defensively fortified, as the fortress had a trench and many towers of varying sizes. Visoki was first mentioned in a charter written in the royal town of Visoki, and was named in castro nosto Visoka vocatum. The charter was written by a young ban, Tvrtko I of Bosnia, who later became king in 1377 by his coronation in Mile. Several other rulers and nobles wrote charters in Visoki, including King Stephen Ostoja of Bosnia and Tvrtko Borovinić, who would be the last to write of the old town of Visoki in 1436 in the document on Visoki. 
Visoki was built on Visočica hill, at a height of 766 meters, and 300 meters above the valley where the modern town of Visoko is located. By the time of the Turkish conquest of Bosnia, the old town was probably destroyed and never reconstructed. Few remnants of old Visoki remain, most being preserved in the town's museum. In situ evidence include the remains of foundations of the towers, walls and gates of Visoki. A model has been reconstructed according to plans of Đoko Mazalić made in 1953. The old royal town of Visoki is a national monument of Bosnia and Herzegovina. Today, beginning from 2007 its ruins are being slowly excavated so the town is becoming visible more and more.

Podvisoki 

Podvisoki is a modern settlement in Visoko and was once a medieval subtown of the royal town. It was an important trade center and sometimes a ruler's residence. Podvisoki was one of the earliest examples of the medieval urban environments in Bosnia. In Podvisoki, a colony of Dubrovnik's merchants developed and maintained historically good relations with the Republic of Ragusa. The terms Bosnia and Podvisoki are often mentioned in Ragusan charters and documents. Biggest caravan shipment in medieval Bosnia happened in 1428 between Podvisoki and Dubrovnik. Often, term Bosnia would be identified with Podvisoki, which was one of the most important trade centres in country and located in the core of Bosnian state.

Mile 

Mile was first recorded in 1244 as the home of the Church of Saints Cosmas and Damian, a possession of the Bosnian bishopric. Around 1340, a Franciscan vicarage was established in Mile, the Franciscan monastery in the town was the first in Bosnia. The monastery is located by the modern settlement of Arnautovići on the right bank of the river Bosna. Mile was the coronation and burial place of Bosnian bans and kings during the medieval Bosnian state and was also the site where the Rusag was held. The first king of Bosnia, Tvrtko I Kotromanić, was crowned in Mile in Franciscan church St. Nikola, and later buried there alongside his uncle Stjepan II Kotromanić. An archive with important documents was also located in Mile.

Visoko's museum houses many artifacts founded by archaeological excavations in the valley. One such expedition found a necropolis of stećak, some made in fine detail, including many materials, jewellery, tools, and other artifacts.

Moštre 

There is not much detailed information about the medieval university in the Visoko area, referred to as the place called Bosnia by the Vatican archives. The university at Moštre was first mentioned in 1175 as a high academy of Bosnian religious organization (see Bosnian Church). The university was known for its scholarship in medicine, theology, cosmogony, and ethics. There are four documents that directly or indirectly point to the existence of the high academy in the Visoko Area.

In addition to its university, Moštre was the location of Bosnian church institutions including the house of krstjani. Also, Moštre was a place where charters were sometimes written; for example, in 1323, when ban Stjepan published his charter to Duke Vukoslav, and later in 1381, when king Tvrtko I Kotromanić issued a charter to Hrvoje Vukčić.

Milodraž

Milodraž, first mentioned in a charter King Tvrtko II issued to the Republic of Ragusa on 18 August 1421, was a settlement not exactly situated within the Visoko valley, however it was important neighbor center on an important road connecting Visoko with nearby Fojnica and Kreševo. Other royal charters in correspondence with the Ragusans documents confirm that one of the residences of Tvrtko II and King Thomas was located there.

The settlement's significance was augmented by two royal weddings which took place in it: the wedding of Tvrtko II with Dorothy Garai, in July 1428, and the wedding of Thomas with Katarina Kosača, in May 1446. It is, however, most notable as the place where Mehmed the Conqueror, following the Ottoman conquest of Bosnia in late May 1463, issued the Ahdname to the Bosna Argentina Franciscan friar Anđeo Zvizdović, promising religious tolerance.

Pobrđe Milodraž, the present-day village in Kiseljak, Bosnia and Herzegovina, is located in the same area as medieval Milodraž.

Other locations 

In Biskupići, a plate of Kulin Ban dating from 1193 was found alongside remains of his church, grave, and foundations of buildings from that period. Other notable medieval settlements in the vicinity included Sebinje town, Čajan town in Gračanica—which protected the roads between Visoko and Bobovac—and the town of Bedem i Goduša.
 
In small settlement of Malo Čajno on today's Orthodox church cemetery, a plate of Big Kaznac Nespina was found. The stone slab represents the relief scene of hunting in Romanesque stylistic characteristics. Its length is 210 cm, height 106 cm, and thickness is 7–10 cm. Cyrillic inscription reveals the title and name of the distinguished representative of the state administration whose task was to collect rulers revenues. Because of the carved relief there are indications that it is much older than 13th century as it was originally believed, so some experts date it to the 8th century.

See also 
Middle ages
Historic documents written in Visoki
History of Bosnia and Herzegovina
Medieval Bosnian state
Bosnian rulers
Bosnia (region)
Bosnia (early medieval polity)

References

Sources 
Desanka Kovačević-Kojić, Sarajevo (1978). Gradska naselja srednjovjekovne Bosanske države

External links 
Text about Pavo Anđelić and his research works
Francisian church in Mile
 Pictures and short description of Mile from official tourism board of Zenica-Doboj canton

Kingdom of Bosnia
Medieval Bosnian state
Medieval Bosnia and Herzegovina
Župas of the medieval Bosnian state
Zemljas of the medieval Bosnian state
Principality of Bosnia (early medieval)
Banate of Bosnia